Hussein Onn formed the first Hussein cabinet after being invited by Tuanku Yahya Petra to begin a new government following the death of the previous Prime Minister of Malaysia, Abdul Razak Hussein. Prior to the death, Razak led (as Prime Minister) the second Razak cabinet, a coalition government that consisted of members of the component parties of Barisan Nasional. It was the 7th cabinet of Malaysia formed since independence.

A reshuffle of the cabinet was done on 31 December 1977, due to Parti Islam Se-Malaysia expulsion from Barisan Nasional, resignation of Health Minister Lee Siok Yew, and the death of Minister of Agriculture Ali Ahmad from the plane crash at Tanjung Kupang.

This is a list of the members of the first cabinet of the third Prime Minister of Malaysia, Hussein Onn.

Composition

Full members
The federal cabinet consisted of the following ministers:

Deputy ministers

Composition before cabinet dissolution

Full members

Deputy ministers

See also
 Members of the Dewan Rakyat, 4th Malaysian Parliament
 List of parliamentary secretaries of Malaysia#First Hussein cabinet

References

Cabinet of Malaysia
1976 establishments in Malaysia
1978 disestablishments in Malaysia
Cabinets established in 1976
Cabinets disestablished in 1978